Henry Katumba Tamale  (born March 28, 1960) is a Ugandan. Anglican Bishop. 

In the 1980s, Henry began his active participation in Church of Uganda which led him to be ordained as a Priest in 1985. He married Rev. Elizabeth Julia Katumba Tamale on Dec 12, 1987 at Namirembe Cathedral, Uganda. They have five children.
Henry is the sixth bishop of West Buganda Diocese in the Church of Uganda, having been consecrated and taking office on 28 August 2016. He was previously a priest and assistant to the Bishop of Namirembe. In 2017, Bishop Tamale said the lack of good roads in Buganda made travel hard.

References

Living people
Ugandan Anglicans
1960 births